Keystone Lake is a reservoir in northeastern Oklahoma on the Arkansas and Cimarron rivers. It was created in 1968 when the Keystone Dam was completed. The primary purposes are: flood control, hydroelectric power generation, wildlife management and recreation.

General description
It was named for the community of Keystone, which existed on the site from 1900 until 1962, when it was inundated by the waters of the lake. Construction of the lake forced the relocation of three other towns: Mannford, Oklahoma (also known as New Mannford by locals), Prue (also known as New Prue), and Appalachia Bay, Oklahoma. The town of Osage was partially abandoned to the lake, while the rest clings to the south shore. Engineers built a levee around low-lying areas of the south and east sides of Cleveland, Oklahoma to prevent flooding of that city.

Two Oklahoma state parks, Keystone State Park and Walnut Creek State Park, are located along the shores of the lake offering camping, hiking and biking trails, fishing, swimming and boating opportunities. The area also features a Yogi Bear's Jellystone Park Camp-Resort as you cross the Keystone Dam near Sand Springs.

The Keystone Lake project was authorized by the Flood Control Act of 1950. It was designed and built by the Tulsa District, Army Corps of Engineers. Construction began in January 1957 and was complete for flood control purposes in September 1964. Commercial operation of the power generating facility began in May 1968.

Cost of the total project was approximately $123 million. In 1986, the reregulating dam was removed due to public safety issues, as 16 people had drowned at the dam.

Dam construction details
The dam was actually constructed across the Arkansas River, downstream of the confluence with the Cimarron River. It is built of rolled earthfill material. The non-overflow part of the concrete section includes a power intake structure. State Highway 151 crosses the dam, connecting State Highway 51 on the south with U.S. Highway 64 on the north.

The spillway also has nine sluices, each .

The power intake structure is between the spillway and the left non-overflow section of the dam. It includes two penstocks, each  diameter and controlled by two  gates.

Largest release in service
As a result, a private levee in West Tulsa failed, causing more than $1.3 million in damages.

Recreation

According to the Corps of Engineers website, Keystone Lake has 16 recreational areas (including 3  alcohol-free beaches), 11 boat ramps, 4 marinas and 2 off-road vehicle areas. There are also campgrounds, a waterfowl refuge and a public hunting area. Keystone State Park nearby offers cabins. Fishing is popular, with the most plentiful species being striped bass, white bass, black bass, small mouth bass, crappie, and catfish. Fauna around the lake include: white-tailed deer, raccoon, bobcat, coyote, beaver, squirrel, cottontail rabbit,  quail, dove, ducks and geese. Hunting and fishing licenses are regulated by Oklahoma and Federal laws.

Notes

References

External links
 Keystone Lake information, photos and videos on TravelOK.com Official travel and tourism website for the State of Oklahoma
 Oklahoma Digital Maps: Digital Collections of Oklahoma and Indian Territory

Protected areas of Creek County, Oklahoma
Protected areas of Osage County, Oklahoma
Protected areas of Pawnee County, Oklahoma
Reservoirs in Oklahoma
Protected areas of Tulsa County, Oklahoma
Infrastructure completed in 1968
Bodies of water of Tulsa County, Oklahoma
Bodies of water of Creek County, Oklahoma
Bodies of water of Osage County, Oklahoma
Bodies of water of Pawnee County, Oklahoma
1968 establishments in Oklahoma